Northumbrian Universities Air Squadron (NUAS ) is a unit of the Royal Air Force which provides basic flying training, adventurous training and personal development skills to undergraduate students of the  University of Durham, University of Newcastle upon Tyne, Northumbria University, Sunderland University and Teesside University. The idea behind all University Air Squadrons is to allow potential RAF officers to experience life in service and to allow them to decide whether they are suited to it. There is no obligation to join up, unless a bursary is successfully applied for.
NUAS is parented by RAF Leeming where it flies Grob Tutor aircraft. 
NUAS Town Headquarters (THQ) are in  Newcastle upon Tyne.

Training nights are held on Tuesday evenings at NUAS THQ, and are compulsory for Officer Cadets. Christmas (Freshers' Camp), Easter and Summer Training periods, each a week long, are held at RAF Leeming to further the development of members through flying, adventurous training, sport and force development.

History 
NUAS began life in 1941 as Durham University Air Squadron, operating Tiger Moths from RAF Woolsington (now Newcastle International Airport). It moved to RAF Ouston in 1974 and re-equipped with Chipmunk T10s. The name was changed to Northumbrian Universities Air Squadron in 1963 when Newcastle University was established, and following a move to RAF Leeming in 1974 it converted to the Bulldog TMK1.

Affiliated Units
NUAS parents 11 Air Experience Flight with which it shares aircraft to allow local cadet units the chance to experience flying.

Activities 

The minimum commitment for UAS membership is attendance at weekly training nights during term-time, generally held in Newcastle (see Town Nights below). A whole host of other activities are available on a sign up basis to provide an insight into life in the RAF.

Flying

Students follow a modified form of the Elementary Flying Syllabus covering the basics of flight up to solo navigation exercises. Students that complete this initial syllabus can then progress to the Advanced Flying Syllabus and learn formation flying, aerobatics, and low-level navigation skills. Each student is nominally allocated 10 hours of flying training each year, though some flyers exceed this amount.

The flying aspect of NUAS is overseen by the Commanding Officer (OC NUAS) and the Chief Flying Instructor (CFI), both of which are RAF Qualified Flying Instructors (QFIs). Additional Instructors are sometimes available on flying Training Periods.

All flying is based at RAF Leeming where the Grob Tutor is used as the instructional aircraft. Previous types operated were the de Havilland Chipmunk and Scottish Aviation Bulldog.

Adventurous Training
NUAS participates in many forms of adventurous training (AT), including climbing, canoeing, kayaking, mountaineering, sailing, ski touring and mountain biking. The squadron's Ground Training Instructor (GTI) facilitates many of the above activities, but most activities and exercises are organised by students - either individually, or in small groups.

NUAS relies heavily on student instructors for adventurous training (AT). Qualifications can be gained by attending a Joint Services Adventure Training (JSAT) course, which is usually free. Students attending will be taught the necessary techniques for successful and safe instruction in their chosen discipline, and can then lead others on AT.

NUAS holds an annual Ski Trip, most recently to France and then Andorra, as well as one or two other major expeditions. These expeditions have involved travelling to places such as Iceland for Mountain Biking and Corsica, where students hiked part of the G20.

Force Development
Force Development (FD) includes visits to places of historical or educational value, such as museums and cities both in the UK and abroad. Most exercises are organised by students. Previous years have seen students visit Malta, Poland, Belgium, the Netherlands and Cyprus.

Sports
NUAS takes part in many inter-UAS and inter-service competitions, and occasionally provides an RAF presence at major sporting fixtures. NUAS also participates in the RAF Leeming CO's Cup each year.

Charities
Every year NUAS students select a charity or charities to fundraise for throughout the year through student-run events. Each year a Charity Town Night is timetabled in order to raise money for a charity selected by the students.

Town Nights
These are weekly training nights which happen every Tuesday in Newcastle during term time (twice a term in Durham). A student appointed as the Town Night Exec arranges a timetable of activities throughout the academic year, covering a range of subjects from Air Power to Leadership Qualities. As mentioned, Town Nights are compulsory activities for all student members of NUAS, and written permission is required from OC NUAS if a student is unable to attend.

Joining
Students can join NUAS in any year at university, provided they have five complete terms remaining on their course, and usually stay for two years, provided their attitude and commitment are good. Students from the Universities of Durham, Newcastle, Northumbria, Sunderland and Teesside may apply to join. Students who are deemed an asset may be invited to continue their careers with NUAS and stay for a further year, subject to them remaining in university and remaining committed to joining the RAF. After completing the joining process a successful student would be attested and become a member of the Volunteer Reserve in the rank of Officer Cadet.

Medical and Fitness
Once attested, students have to pass a medical and a fitness test (The Royal Air Force Fitness Test). 
While general good fitness will improve anyone's quality of life, NUAS requires a minimum standard in line with the RAFFT Officer standards.

Bursaries
Bursaries are available for most branches and can be applied for before joining (conferring automatic UAS membership) or after joining a UAS.
The current system gives a successful candidate £6,000 over the course of their degree, more for certain branches such as Engineering or Medical.
The application process consists of an interview at a career office, for UAS members and non-members respectively. If successful an invitation for selection at the OASC may follow.
Successful applicants will be expected to be an example on their squadron and must join the RAF on completion of their degrees, or return all bursary monies.

Structure
The Commanding Officer (OC NUAS) has overall responsibility, supported by the Adjutant who oversees administrative tasks and is supported by office staff at the squadron's town headquarters.
The student body has a Senior Student, usually an Acting Pilot Officer (APO) who essentially heads the student body, and aside from the extra commitment organising activities, he or she acts as a liaison to the permanent staff.
The Senior Student is supported by three Flight Commanders, again APOs, who oversee the three student flights and participate in the running of the squadron.

They are assisted by an executive committee which is chosen from the student body each year.

Commanding Officers

2008-2012 Sqn Ldr Lee Toomey 

2012-2013 Sqn Ldr Damon Middleton 

2014-2016 Sqn Ldr Graham Edwards 

2016-2018 Sqn Ldr Keith Dickerson 

2018-2020 Sqn Ldr Christopher Mace

2020-Present Sqn Ldr Julian Fowell

See also
Yorkshire Universities Air Squadron
Birmingham University Air Squadron
East of Scotland Universities Air Squadron
Liverpool University Air Squadron
Oxford University Air Squadron
Universities of Glasgow and Strathclyde Air Squadron
University Royal Naval Unit, the Royal Navy equivalent
Officers Training Corps, the British Army equivalent
List of Royal Air Force aircraft squadrons

References

External links
UAS Squadrons website
NUAS website

Hambleton District
Newcastle University
Organisations based in North Yorkshire
Royal Air Force university air squadrons